Alto (Italian for "high") is a musical term that has several possible interpretations.

Alto may also refer to:

Places

Brazil
Alto, Teresópolis, a neighborhood in Teresópolis, Brazil

Italy
Alto, Piedmont, a comune in the Province of Cuneo

United States
Alto, Arizona, a ghost town in Santa Cruz County
Alto, California, a former unincorporated community in Marin County
Alto, Georgia, a town divided between Banks County and Habersham County
Alto, Indiana, an unincorporated community in Howard County
Alto, Michigan, an unincorporated community in Kent County
Alto, New Mexico, an unincorporated community in Lincoln County
Alto, Texas, a town in Cherokee County
Alto, Wisconsin, a town in Fond du Lac County
Alto (community), Wisconsin, an unincorporated community in Fond du Lac County

People
Alto of Altomünster, a German saint
Alto, spouse of Mr Percival, famous Australian pelican and film actor

Music
Alto, a voice part in choral music, sung by either:
Alto or Contralto, the lowest female voice
Male alto or contratenor, the highest male voice
Members of a family of instruments, including:
Althorn, the German name for tenor horn, a brass instrument
Alto saxophone, a woodwind instrument
Alto, the French name for viola, a string instrument
Alto clef

Technology
Direct Fly Alto, a Czech ultralight aircraft
Suzuki Alto, a Japanese car
Maruti Suzuki Alto, an Indian version of the Suzuki Alto
Xerox Alto, an experimental American personal computer
ALTO (interbank network), in Indonesia
ALTO (protocol), a protocol for applications to discover routing costs to different endpoints
ALTO (XML), an open XML standard to describe OCR text and layout information of printed documents
Air-launch-to-orbit, a method of launching rockets at altitude from a conventional horizontal-takeoff aircraft, abbreviated as "ALTO"

Other uses
Nilfisk-Advance, a supplier of professional cleaning equipment has an Alto brand
ALTO (film), a 2015 American-Italian mob comedy film
Alto's Adventure, a video game
Cirrus cloud#Relation to other clouds, where the prefix "alto-" is applied to cloud genera

See also 
Alta (disambiguation)  
Aalto (disambiguation)
El Alto (disambiguation)